is a railway station in the town of  Yōrō, Yōrō District, Gifu Prefecture, Japan, operated by the private railway operator Yōrō Railway.

Lines

Station layout
Yōrō  Station has one ground-level side platform and one ground-level island platform connected by a level crossing. The station building, completed in 1919 is in the style of Giyōfū architecture. The station is staffed.

Platforms

Adjacent stations

|-
!colspan=5|Yōrō Railway

History
Yōrō  Station opened on July 31, 1913.

Passenger statistics
In fiscal 2015, the station was used by an average of 646 passengers daily (boarding passengers only).

Surrounding area
 Yōrō Park

See also
 List of Railway Stations in Japan

References

External links

 

Railway stations in Gifu Prefecture
Railway stations in Japan opened in 1913
Stations of Yōrō Railway
Yōrō District, Gifu
Yōrō, Gifu